Thomas Smith House may refer to:
Tom Smith House, Elkins, AR, listed on the NRHP in Arkansas
Thomas W. Smith House, Tennille, GA, listed on the NRHP in Georgia
 Thomas Smith House (New Castle, Kentucky), listed on the NRHP in Kentucky
Thomas and Esther Smith House, Agawam, MA, listed on the NRHP in Massachusetts
 Thomas Smith House (Mount Laurel, New Jersey), listed on the NRHP in New Jersey
Thomas J. and Amanda N. Smith House, Kaysville, UT, listed on the NRHP in Utah

See also
Smith House